ZIC3 is a member of the Zinc finger of the cerebellum (ZIC) protein family.

ZIC3 is classified as a ZIC protein due to conservation of the five C2H2 zinc fingers, which enables the protein to interact with DNA and proteins. Correct function of this protein family in critical for early development, and as such mutations of the genes encoding these proteins is known to result in various congenital defects. For example, mutation of ZIC3 is associated with heterotaxy, that is thought to occur due to the role of ZIC3 in initial left-right symmetry formation, which involves the maintaining redistributed Nodal after the asymmetry of the embryo is initially broken. Mutation of ZIC3 is also associated with various heart defects, such as heart looping, however these are thought to represent a mild form of heterotaxy. Mouse based studies have linked defective ZIC3 with neural tube defects (spina bifida and exencephaly) and skeletal defects  as well indicated a role for Zic3 in neural crest specification.  Both the left-right defects and the neural tube defects caused by loss of Zic3 have been linked to defective planar cell polarity. 

ZIC3 is also of particular interest as it has been shown to be required for maintenance of embryonic stem cell pluripotency.

Involvement in Wnt signalling
ZIC2, another member of the ZIC family, has recently been found to interact with TCF7L2, enabling it to act as a Wnt/β-catenin  signalling inhibitor. Further experiments have indicated that human ZIC3 is also able to inhibit Wnt signalling and that the Zinc finger domains are absolutely critical for this role. Such a role is of critical importance, as not only is correct Wnt signalling critical for early development, Wnt signalling has also been found to be upregulated to several cancers. In addition Zic3 inhibition of canonical Wnt has recently been shown to have a role in specification of the neural crest in mice.

References

Further reading